Gayle Mill may refer to:

Gayle Mill, North Yorkshire, a late 18th-century mill
Gayle Mill, South Carolina, an area with a population of 1,000